Back with Basie (subtitled More Hit Performances of the '60s) is an album released by pianist, composer and bandleader Count Basie featuring tracks recorded in 1962 (with one from 1960) and originally released on the Roulette label.

Reception

AllMusic awarded the album 3 stars.

Track listing
 "Peppermint Pipes" (Frank Wess) – 3:15
 "Thanks for the Ride" (Roy Alfred) – 3:40
 "The Elder" (Thad Jones) – 7:00
 "Summer Frost" (Wess) – 3:06
 "The Touch of Your Lips" (Ray Noble) – 3:15
 "Bluish Grey" (Jones) – 4:56
 "One Note Samba" (Antonio Carlos Jobim, Newton Mendonça) – 4:09
 "I Got It Bad (and That Ain't Good)" (Duke Ellington) – 3:15
 "Matte Jersey" (Frank Foster) – 3:55
 "Red Hot Mama" (Ernie Wilkins) – 3:29
Recorded in New York City in December 1960 (track 10), July 1, 1962 (tracks 3, 4 & 8), July 13, 1962 (tracks 2 & 9), July 25, 1962 (track 5 & 6) and July 26, 1962 (tracks 1 & 7)

Personnel 
Count Basie – piano
Al Aarons (tracks 1–9), Sonny Cohn, Thad Jones, Joe Newman (track 10), Fip Ricard (tracks 1–9), Snooky Young (track 10) – trumpet
Henry Coker, Al Grey (track 10), Quentin Jackson (tracks 1–9), Benny Powell – trombone
Marshal Royal, Frank Wess – alto saxophone
Eric Dixon (tracks 1–9), Frank Foster, Billy Mitchell (track 10) – tenor saxophone
Charlie Fowlkes – baritone saxophone
Freddie Green – guitar
Art Davis (tracks 3, 4 & 8), Ike Isaacs (tracks 1, 2, 5–7 & 9), Eddie Jones (track 10) – bass
Louis Bellson (tracks 1, 3–7 & 8), Sonny Payne (tracks 2, 9 & 10) – drums
Irene Reid – vocals (tracks 3, 4 & 8)

References 

1962 albums
Count Basie Orchestra albums
Roulette Records albums
Albums produced by Teddy Reig